Collier or colliers may refer to:

Coal industry
 Collier, coal miner or coal merchant
 Colliery, coal mining and selling; or a coal mine
Collier (ship), a bulk cargo ship which carried coal
Charcoal maker, in colonial United States and also in Sussex, England
Collier, Royalty

Places
Collier Row, a place in the London Borough of Havering
 Colliers Wood, an area in the London Borough of Merton
Collier County, Florida, a county of Florida's southwest coast
Collier, Georgia, an unincorporated community
Colliers, West Virginia, a small town in the northern panhandle area of West Virginia
Colliers, Newfoundland and Labrador, a town on the Avalon Peninsula
Collier Township, Allegheny County, Pennsylvania, a suburb of Pittsburgh
Collier Range National Park, Australian park
Collier High School (New Jersey), a school in Wickatunk, New Jersey

People
 Collier (surname)
 Collier Twentyman Smithers (1867–1943), British portrait artist

Other
 Collier Baronets, a title in the British honours system
  Collier Books, a publishing imprint of Macmillan Publishing Company
 Collier's Encyclopedia, a U.S. encyclopedia
 Collier Motors, the last auto dealer in the U.S. under the American Motors banner
 Collier (necklace), a type of necklace, possibly a synonym for choker
 Collier Trophy, is the highest honor in American aviation
 Collier's, a U.S. magazine published between 1888 and 1957
 Colliers (company), commercial real estate services company
 Colliers Wood United F.C., an English association football club